A referendum on the formation of the Pridnestrovian Moldavian Soviet Socialist Republic was held in Transnistria between 1989 and 1990. The first voting took place in Rîbnița on 3 December 1989. In Tiraspol voting was held on 28 January. After the June congress of the local Soviet, voting was held in the districts of Bender, Dubăsari, Sloboza, Camenca and Grigoriopol. The overall total showed 95.8% voting in favour. The Pridnestrovian Moldavian Soviet Socialist Republic was declared at the second meeting of the Soviet on 2 September 1990.

Results

References

Referendums in the Soviet Union
Referendums in Transnistria
Referendums in Moldova
1989 in the Moldavian Soviet Socialist Republic
1989 in Transnistria
1989 referendums
1990 in the Moldavian Soviet Socialist Republic
1990 in Transnistria
1990 referendums
1990